Warren Community Unit School District 205 is a school district headquartered in Warren, Illinois.

It operates Warren Elementary School and Warren Jr/Sr High School.

References

External links
 
School districts in Illinois
Education in Jo Daviess County, Illinois